KidZania Manila was an indoor family entertainment center in Bonifacio Global City, Taguig, Metro Manila, Philippines. It was a franchise of KidZania, a Mexican chain of family entertainment centers which allowed children aged 4 to 14 to work in adult jobs and earn currency. KidZania Manila was opened to the general public on August 7, 2015, making it the 11th KidZania  in Asia and the 20th in the world.

Background
KidZania Manila operates like a real city that is built to the scale of children, complete with paved roads and vehicles, buildings and establishments, a functioning economy and its own currency. Designed for children aged 4 to 14, KidZania Manila houses more than 55 establishments most of which are sponsored by real brands with over 70 role play activities. At KidZania Manila, children perform ‘jobs’ and are either paid for their work (as a stylist, fireman, radio jockey, surgeon, etc...) or pay to get a service (university, culinary school, department store, driving school, pit crew, etc...).

Upon entering KidZania Manila, one is given a boarding pass, a map of the city, and 50 KidZos (the official currency of KidZania) paycheck upon entry. Inside, one can work on over 70 different professions. Some establishments require children to pay a significant amount of KidZos. If one runs out of money, they must work in establishments that offer salaries. A security bracelet is also given to the children upon entry.

Due to the losses amid the COVID-19 pandemic in the country and the retrenchment of ABS-CBN employees due to the ABS-CBN franchise renewal controversy, KidZania Manila was permanently closed since August 31, 2020.

Awards
KidZania Manila, together with its PR agency, Strategic Works, Inc., won two Anvil Awards in 2017.

References

ABS-CBN subsidiaries
Amusement parks in the Philippines
Defunct amusement parks
Kidzania theme parks
Bonifacio Global City
Tourist attractions in Metro Manila
Assets owned by ABS-CBN Corporation
2020 disestablishments in the Philippines